Tinnitus Sanctus is the eighth studio album by German heavy/power metal band Edguy, released on 14 November 2008 on Nuclear Blast. This album combines progressive-oriented hard rock heard on their previous album Rocket Ride with elements of speed metal.

The album was released in several formats. The standard edition was issued in a jewel case and included the 10 album tracks and a bonus track. A digipak edition included the album with the bonus track, and a bonus live CD, recorded in Los Angeles during the Rocket Ride tour. A mailorder edition, available exclusively through the Nuclear Blast webshop, was issued in a tin case. A double LP version was also available.

Initial press reaction to the album was positive, with Tanja Weinekötter of Fury calling it "the strongest Edguy album so far", whilst frontman Tobias Sammet felt that it "could be the album we'll be measured by in the future".

A video was shot for the track "Ministry of Saints" in Belgrade, Serbia.

Track listing

Personnel 
Band members
Tobias Sammet - vocals
Jens Ludwig - guitar
Dirk Sauer - guitar
Tobias "Eggi" Exxel - bass
Felix Bohnke - drums

Additional musicians
Miro Rodenberg - keyboards
Oliver Hartmann, Thomas Rettke, Claudia Boots-Zimmermann - backing vocals

Production
Sascha Paeth - producer, engineer, mixing, mastering
Miro Rodenberg - engineer, mastering
Simon Oberender, Olaf Reitmeier - engineers

References

External links
Official Edguy site

2008 albums
Edguy albums
Nuclear Blast albums